Helge Vatsend (25 November 1928 – 24 January 1994) was a Norwegian poet and novelist.

He made his literary debut in 1958 with the poetry collection Du. Other collections are Stenbruddet from 1963, and  Fjernsynsdikt from 1982. He published the novel Et hus ved veien in 1965.

He was awarded Mads Wiel Nygaards Endowment in 1982.

References

1928 births
1994 deaths
People from Vest-Agder
20th-century Norwegian poets
Norwegian male poets
20th-century Norwegian novelists
Norwegian male novelists
20th-century Norwegian male writers